Wilson Cemetery is a historic cemetery at Wilson Street on Marlborough, Massachusetts.  The cemetery is a  parcel that is usually accessed via the adjacent Evergreen Cemetery.  Wilson Cemetery was established in 1764, and contains marked graves dating between 1764 and 2000.  Most of the burials date to the 19th century.  The older portion of the cemetery is to the north, where graves are arrayed in rough north–south rows.  A central pathway separates this section from the southern portion, which is laid out in a more formal rectilinear grid.  The most prominent burial is the tomb of Robert Eames, a veteran of the American Revolutionary War.

The cemetery was listed on the National Register of Historic Places in 2004.

See also
National Register of Historic Places listings in Marlborough, Massachusetts

References

Cemeteries on the National Register of Historic Places in Massachusetts
Cemeteries in Marlborough, Massachusetts
National Register of Historic Places in Middlesex County, Massachusetts